Brittany Jayne Furlan (born September 5, 1986) is an American Internet personality, actress and comedian based in Los Angeles.  She was the most followed female video star on Vine until November 2015. She was the 5th most followed viner with 9.9 million followers by the time Vine ended and the second most followed woman.

She was declared by Time in 2015 to be one of the most influential people on the Internet.

Career 

Furlan was born on September 5, 1986, in Perkasie, Pennsylvania to Italian-American parents. She previously tried to break into television before becoming a star on Vine, and signed with content network Endemol.

Furlan was embroiled in a controversy during the 2014 Daytime Emmys Red Carpet show when she told actor Ryan Paevey, "We're going to get you away from us before we rape you."

Personal life
Since early 2017, Furlan has been in a relationship with Mötley Crüe drummer, Tommy Lee.
On February 14, 2018, they announced their engagement on Instagram. They were married a year later on February 14, 2019.

Filmography

Awards and nominations

References

External links
 
 

1986 births
Living people
Actresses from Pennsylvania
American Internet celebrities
American women comedians
21st-century American actresses
Vine (service) celebrities
American people of Italian descent
People from Perkasie, Pennsylvania
Comedians from Pennsylvania
21st-century American comedians